William Champion (born 31 July 1978) is an English musician and songwriter best known as the drummer and backing vocalist of the rock band Coldplay. Raised in Southampton, he learned various instruments during his childhood, being influenced by Bob Dylan, Tom Waits, Nick Cave and traditional Irish folk. His energetic drumming style is based on prioritizing the essential elements of a song and he is known to occasionally take lead vocals during live performances.

Champion has a degree in anthropology at University College London, where he joined Coldplay with Chris Martin, Jonny Buckland and Guy Berryman. The group signed with Parlophone in 1999, finding global fame through the release of Parachutes (2000) and subsequent records. He won seven Grammy Awards and nine Brit Awards as part of Coldplay. The band have sold over 100 million albums worldwide as of 2021, making them the most successful group of the 21st century.

Early life
William Champion was born on 31 July 1978 in Southampton, Hampshire, England, being the second child of archaeology lecturers Timothy and Sara Champion. He was raised in the Highfield suburb of the city close to the University of Southampton, where his parents worked. He studied at Portswood Primary School while secondary education was held at Cantell School and Peter Symonds College. During his youth, Champion played cricket for Chandler's Ford CC along with his older brother, they were known to attend Highfield Church as well. He commented that music was "constantly on the stereo at home", which included listening to "anything from Bob Dylan, Tom Waits and Nick Cave to traditional Irish folk", and performed in a group called Fat Hamster.

His upbringing influenced him to start lessons on various instruments, including violin and piano from the age of eight, guitar when he was twelve, and eventually bass and tin whistle. However, Champion did not always enjoy the sessions, given he could not read music and played songs mostly from memory instead: "I watched my teacher's hand on the piano, memorized it, and ended up doing it myself". Despite occasionally playing drums at school and with his neighbour's kit, he was not interested on the instrument yet. He also did work experience at Nuffield Theatre's box office and backstage when he was 14 years old.

Champion's education then continued in University College London, where he attained a 2:1 degree in anthropology and met Chris Martin, Jonny Buckland and Guy Berryman, eventually forming Coldplay. Years later, during an interview for Drum! magazine, he stated that having experience with other instruments helped with his coordination and offered a different perspective from other drummers, being a notable part of his style: "Knowing the difference between the major and minor key is very important too, and I was lucky to learn all that before I was playing drums. That has more to do with the feel of a song, knowing what's right for the song, instead of knowing how to play powerfully for a second or two".

Career

Coldplay

Champion was the fourth and last member to join the band in 1998. He explained that Martin, Buckland and Berryman came to his house because a roommate had a drum kit and was a good drummer, but he had not turned up, "so I just said I would give it a go". They recorded the session and he was eventually invited to the ensemble in spite of basically not having prior experience. In 1999, he was temporarily sacked from the group by Martin over heated discussions regarding his abilities as a drummer: "Three days later, the rest of us were feeling miserable, [...] we asked him to come back. They made me have lots of vodka and cranberry juice in remembrance of what a nasty piece of work I was being". The incident became an inspiration for "Trouble", which was written as an apology to him.

In Coldplay, Champion is often regarded as the rationality of the band, with Martin saying "When I think of him, I think of something heavy and granite-like. Like the base of a statue. Without that, the thing topples". While answering questions from fans, other members added that he "does have a very sensible head on his shoulders and when it comes to making decisions he is really good at putting valid points across and keeping everyone focused. He frequently has the casting vote and his decision can sometimes override the consensus". They often praise his multi-instrumentalism as well, describing him as a "human jukebox". Although Buckland and Berryman have taken part in backing vocals, Champion remained the most prominent. During the Viva la Vida Tour, he performed an acoustic version of the song "Death Will Never Conquer", which was later included on LeftRightLeftRightLeft (2009). His lead vocals can also be heard on "The Goldrush", a B-side for "Life in Technicolor II". Meanwhile, his rendition of "In My Place" from the A Head Full of Dreams Tour was released on Live in Buenos Aires (2018).

Other projects
Champion guested on a-ha keyboardist Magne Furuholmen's debut album, Past Perfect Future Tense (2004), along with Berryman. He also made a cameo appearance as one of the Red Wedding musicians in the "Rains of Castamere" episode from Game of Thrones, which aired on 2 June 2013. In the following year, he contributed to Brian Eno and Karl Hyde's collaborative album, Someday World (2014), by playing electronic drums. In November 2017, he visited the University of Southampton to talk with music students about his experience in the music industry, composing, studio recording, live performances and stardom. Along with Buckland, he assisted Jodie Whittaker in her cover of "Yellow" for BBC's Children in Need album in October 2019. He is a supporter of DrumathonLIVE as well; the virtual charity event raises money for children's mental health and features numerous drummers from around the world. In 2023, Champion received an honorary degree as Doctor of Music from the University of Southampton.

Musical style
Champion's first drum kit was a Yamaha 9000. Since A Rush of Blood to the Head (2002), however, he uses a custom maple set with a 22"x16" bass drum, 13"x9" rack tom, 16"x15" floor tom, various snare drums and Zildjian cymbals (20" K Heavy ride, brilliant finish; 18" A Custom Medium crash [x2] and 14" K Custom Dark hi-hats). The drumheads are Remo coated ambassadors and he plays with Pro-Mark's hickory wood 5A drum sticks. Champion also owns a Yamaha hardware, a Roc-N-Soc drum throne, two electronic drum pads and one electronic percussion pad. Noted for an energetic drumming style, he was not confident to play loud or heavy at first, which became part his performance: "That is my trademark – Wait, keep waiting" and "at the last moment possible come in and steal the limelight at the end".

When questioned on which Coldplay songs he thinks are his technical or "feel-wise" best, Champion commented being most proud of tracks where everything is boiled down to the essentials, citing "Viva la Vida" as an example: "It's just a kick drum, a bell and a little bit of timpani here and there, but it's so simple [...] We tried so many different things with that, four-beats, rock beats, everything – but nothing worked. It was a case of you've got to strip absolutely everything away to its very, very bare minimum. There are so many intricacies on the violins, the melodies and everything, I just felt it have to be simple with no frills, just support the song". He named Ginger Baker (Cream), John Bonham (Led Zeppelin) and Dave Grohl (Foo Fighters) as some of his favourite drummers as well, receiving compliments from the latter in return.

Personal life
According to The Times, Champion has an estimated wealth of £113 million as of May 2022. He is a lifelong fan of Southampton F.C. and has owned a seasonal ticket for many years. His parents Tim and Sara used to DJ as Champion Tunes at local pubs, the latter died from cancer in 2000. Her funeral was scheduled for the same day Coldplay had to shoot the music video for "Yellow", which is why only Martin appeared on it. Their debut album, Parachutes, was later dedicated to her. In 2003, he married teacher Marianne Dark, becoming the first band member to wed. They have three children and reside in the Hampstead area of Camden, London.

When asked about fame, Champion said he loves that after playing stadiums around the world, he is able to "disappear" back to his children (who are studying Suzuki method violin) and his wife (who sings in Brian Eno's private choir). This "skill" was subject of a sketch by British comedian Nish Kumar in Live at the Apollo. The drummer also mentioned the way Martin has to deal a lot more with practical things becoming difficult would "drive him crazy". His favourite non-musical activity is cooking and he frequently dances with Dark at their house. Her backing vocals were included in the title track of Everyday Life (2019), being the piece of music Champion likes the most from the record.

Discography

With Coldplay

 Parachutes (2000)
 A Rush of Blood to the Head (2002)
 X&Y (2005)
 Viva la Vida or Death and All His Friends (2008)
 Mylo Xyloto (2011)
 Ghost Stories (2014)
 A Head Full of Dreams (2015)
 Everyday Life (2019)
 Music of the Spheres (2021)

Solo credits
 Past Perfect Future Tense (2004) – drummer
 Someday World (2014) – drummer

See also
 List of people associated with University College London
 List of British Grammy winners and nominees
 List of best-selling music artists
 List of highest-grossing live music artists
 List of artists who reached number one on the UK Singles Chart
 List of Billboard Hot 100 number-ones by British artists

Notes

References

Further reading

External links

 
 Coldplay Official Website
 Coldplay on AllMusic

1978 births
Living people
20th-century British guitarists
20th-century English male musicians
20th-century drummers
21st-century British guitarists
21st-century English male musicians
21st-century drummers
Alternative rock drummers
Alternative rock guitarists
Alternative rock keyboardists
Alternative rock pianists
Alumni of University College London
Atlantic Records artists
British alternative rock musicians
British male drummers
British male pianists
British male songwriters
British male violinists
Capitol Records artists
Coldplay members
English male guitarists
English multi-instrumentalists
English pop guitarists
English pop pianists
English rock drummers
English rock guitarists
English rock keyboardists
English rock pianists
English songwriters
Musicians from Southampton
Parlophone artists
People educated at Peter Symonds College